Henry Isaac Stevens FRIBA was an architect based in Derby. He was born in London, in 1806, and died in 1873. In the late 1850s he changed his name to Isaac Henry Stevens.

Family

His parents were Isaac Stevens and Elizabeth Young. He married Anne, the daughter of William Martin on 7 August 1832 in Repton, Derbyshire. They had four children.

In the 1861, census he is listed as Isaac H Stevens living in Ashbourne Road, Mackworth, Derbyshire. In the 1871, census he is listed as living at 20 Peartree Road in Litchurch, Derby.

Career

He was articled to William Martin in Bretby, and was also a pupil of George Maddox. He started in independent practice in 1834 in Hartshorne, Derbyshire. He moved to Derby in the late 1830s or early 1840s and was based at 16 Full Street in Derby. By 1847 he was at 49 Friargate, Derby. In 1857 he is listed as living in Mackworth.

He was awarded a Fellowship of the Royal Institute of British Architects on 21 January 1850.

He entered into a partnership with Frederick Josias Robinson, a former pupil, from 1859.

New buildings

Christ Church, Coalville 1836–38
St James Church, Shardlow. 1837–39
St. John the Evangelist, Donisthorpe, Leicestershire 1837–38
Holy Trinity, Ashby-de-la-Zouch, Leicestershire. 1840.
Holy Trinity Church, Trinity Square, Nottingham. 1841. Demolished 1958.
Holy Trinity Church, Lenton, Nottingham. 1842
St. Mary's Church, Stretton, East Staffordshire 1837–42
St. Paul's Church, Hyson Green, Nottingham 1843–44
Congregational Chapel, London Road, Derby. 1843–45
St Martin's Church, Osmaston, Derbyshire, 1843–45
St Alkmund's Church, Derby. 1844-46
Holy Trinity, Clifton, Derbyshire 1844–45
St John the Evangelist's Church, Hazelwood Derbyshire 1844–46
St Stephen's Church, Woodville, Derbyshire 1845–46
Holy Trinity Church, Kimberley, Nottinghamshire 1843–47
St. Mary the Virgin, Coton in the Elms, Derbyshire 1844–47
Osmaston Manor. 1846–49
Christchurch, Ilkeston Road, New Radford, Nottingham. 1847. Demolished 1950.
Emmanuel Church, Swadlincote, Derbyshire 1844–47
Christ Church, Cotmanhay, Ilkeston, Derbyshire 1846–48
St Edmund’s Church, Fenny Bentley, Derbyshire 1846–49
St. Peter, Fordcombe, Penshurst, Kent 1847–49
Church of St. Mary the Virgin and All Souls, Bulwell, Nottingham. 1849–50.
Christ Church, Belper 1846–50
St Bartholomew’s Church, Clay Cross, Derbyshire 1846–51
All Saints' Church, Alderwasley Derbyshire 1849–50
St. Paul's Church, Rusthall, Speldhurst, Kent 1849–51
Christ Church, Ironville 1851–52
Melbourne Athenaeum, Derbyshire. 1853
Brewery at Burton. 1854–55
St Helen's Church, Darley Dale, Derbyshire 1853–55
St. John the Evangelist, St. John's Street, Mansfield. 1854–56
Full Street Baths, Derby. 1856
St. James' Church, Idridgehay, Derbyshire 1853–56
St. Michael & All Angels, Alvaston, Derbyshire. 1856
St. Margaret's Church, Blackfordby, Leicestershire 1856–58
Ashby-de-la-Zouch Town Hall and Market Hall, Leicestershire, 1857
St. Paul's Church, Low Moor, Prestwich, Lancashire 1867–70 with Frederick Josias  Robinson.
St. Luke's Church, Derby 1868–71 with Frederick Josias Robinson.
Canterbury Street drill hall, Blackburn, Lancashire 1869–70 with Frederick Josias Robinson.
St. James, Blackburn, Lancashire 1872–74 with Frederick Josias Robinson.
W. W. Winter photographic studio, 45 Midland Road, Derby c. 1860s.

Gallery of new buildings

Repairs and alterations

References
The Life and Works of Henry Issac Stevens – 1806–1873. PhD Thesis, De Montfort University 1994. Dr Mark K Askey

Sources
The Buildings of England, Nikolaus Pevsner

19th-century English architects
1806 births
1873 deaths
Architects from London
Fellows of the Royal Institute of British Architects
Architects from Derby